The MacHaffie Site is a site on the National Register of Historic Places located south of Helena, Montana.  It was added to the Register on April 3, 1986. The site was discovered in 1938.

References

Archaeological sites on the National Register of Historic Places in Montana
National Register of Historic Places in Jefferson County, Montana
Native American history of Montana